Burhan al-Din al-Zarnuji or Burhan al-Islam al-Zarnuji also spelled az-Zarnuji  was a Muslim scholar and the author of the celebrated pedagogical work Ta'līm al-Muta'allim-Ṭarīq at-Ta'-allum (Instruction of the Student: The Method of Learning).

Life 
Al-Zarnuj was born and lived in Zarnuj, a well-known town beyond the river Oxus in the present Turkistan Region of Kazakhstan. Burhan al-Din (proof of Din) or Burhan al-Islam (proof of Islam) al-Zarnuji were his agnomen, or moniker. Collections of biographies believed that his given name was al-Nu'man ibn Ibrahim.

He studied with many shaykhs including: Shaykh Burhān al-Dīn ‘Alī ibn Abī Bakr al-Marghīnānī  author of Al-Hidāyah, Shaykh Abu al-Muhamid Qawaduddin Hammad ibn Ibrahim al-Saffar; the great Shaykh Hasan ibn Mansur Qadiykhani; and others.

The exact date of his death is unknown, though it is speculated that he died in 620AH (1223CE) in Bukhara.

Works
Al-Zarnuji's treatise, Ta'līm al-Muta'allim-Ṭarīq at-Ta'-allum, is a short introduction to the secrets of attaining knowledge. Acknowledged by many  as a book in which even the most advanced and experienced teachers find advice they have yet to apply in their teaching, this book serves to create the proper  framework for the Sharia program and its students and teachers alike.

References 

 Huda, Miftachul; Kartanegara, Mulyadhi (April 2015). "Ethical Foundation of Character Education in Indonesia: Reflections on Integration between Ahmad Dahlan and Al-Zarnuji." Persidangan Antarbangsa Tokoh Ulama Melayu Nusantara (PanTUMN 2015). Selangor, Malaysia: Kolej Universiti Islam Antarabangsa Selangor. doi:10.13140/RG.2.1.5082.1605.

External links 
Az-Zarnuji Pemandu Santri

13th-century Muslim scholars of Islam